German XIII. Corps (XIII. Armeekorps) was a corps in the German Army during World War II. It was destroyed during the Lvov–Sandomierz Offensive and reformed in late 1944.

Commanders
 Cavalry General (General der Kavallerie) Maximilian von Weichs, 1 October 1937 – 26 October 1939
 Colonel General (Generaloberst) Heinrich von Vietinghoff, 26 October 1939 – 25 October 1940
 Infantry General (General der Infanterie) Hans Felber, 25 October 1940 – 13 January 1942
 Lieutenant General (Generalleutnant) Otto-Ernst Ottenbacher, 14 January 1942 – 21 April 1942
 Infantry General (General der Infanterie) Erich Straube, 21 April 1942 – 20 February 1943
 Infantry General (General der Infanterie) Friedrich Siebert, 20 February 1943 – 7 September 1943
 Infantry General (General der Infanterie) Arthur Hauffe, 7 September 1943 – 25 April 1944
 Lieutenant General (Generalleutnant) Johannes Block, 25 April 1944 – 5 June 1944
 Infantry General (General der Infanterie) Arthur Hauffe, 5 June 1944 – 22 July 1944

After reformation

 Infantry General (General der Infanterie) Hans Felber, 6 December 1944 – 12 February 1945
 Lieutenant General (Generalleutnant) Ralph Graf von Oriola, 12 February 1945 – 31 March 1945
 Lieutenant General (Generalleutnant) Max Bork, 31 March 1945 – 15 April 1945
 Infantry General (General der Infanterie) Walther Hahm, 15 April 1945 – 20 April 1945
 Artillery General (General der Artillerie) Walther Lucht, 20 April 1945 - May 1945

Area of operations
Poland - September 1939 - May 1940
France - May 1940 - June 1941
Eastern Front, southern sector - June 1941 - July 1944
Western Front, Ardennes & Germany - December 1944 - May 1945

See also
 List of German corps in WWII

External links

Military units and formations established in 1937
1937 establishments in Germany